Koundara is a town in northwestern Guinea, near the borders of Guinea-Bissau and Senegal. It is the capital of Koundara Prefecture.  The town is served by Sambailo Airport. As of 2014 it had a population of 27,433 people.

Climate
Koundara has a tropical savanna climate (Köppen climate classification Aw), with the temperature being hot year round, and with a wet and dry season.

References

Sub-prefectures of the Boké Region